This is a list of Anthurium species, a superdiverse genus of flowering plants from the arum family (Araceae). There are known to be at least 1,000 described species.

A 

Anthurium abajoense 
Anthurium acanthospadix 
Anthurium acaule 
Anthurium acebeyae 
Anthurium achupallense 
Anthurium aciculare 
Anthurium aciforme 
Anthurium acutangulum 
Anthurium acutibacca 
Anthurium acutifolium 
Anthurium acutissimum 
Anthurium acutum 
Anthurium aduncum 
Anthurium affine 
Anthurium agnatum 
Anthurium alatipedunculatum 
Anthurium alatum 
Anthurium albertiae 
Anthurium albidum 
Anthurium albispadix 
Anthurium albispatha 
Anthurium albovirescens 
Anthurium alcatrazense 
Anthurium alcogolloi 
Anthurium alegriasense 
Anthurium alfaroi 
Anthurium algentryi 
Anthurium alluriquinense 
Anthurium alstonii 
Anthurium altaverapazense 
Anthurium alticola 
Anthurium altobueyense 
Anthurium alturaense 
Anthurium alvinii 
Anthurium amargalense 
Anthurium ameliae 
Anthurium amistadense 
Anthurium amnicola 
Anthurium amoenum 
Anthurium anceps 
Anthurium anchicayense 
Anthurium ancuashii 
Anthurium andicola 
Anthurium andinum 
Anthurium andraeanum 
Anthurium andreslovinense 
Anthurium angelopolisense 
Anthurium angosturense 
Anthurium angustatum 
Anthurium angustifolium 
Anthurium angustilaminatum 
Anthurium angustilobum 
Anthurium angustisectum 
Anthurium angustispadix 
Anthurium annularum 
Anthurium anorianum 
Anthurium antioquiense 
Anthurium antonioanum 
Anthurium antrophyoides 
Anthurium apanui 
Anthurium apaporanum 
Anthurium apiaense 
Anthurium arandae 
Anthurium arbelaezii 
Anthurium archilae 
Anthurium arcuatum 
Anthurium arenasense 
Anthurium argyrostachyum 
Anthurium aripoense 
Anthurium arisaemoides 
Anthurium aristatum 
Anthurium armbrusteri 
Anthurium armeniense 
Anthurium aroense 
Anthurium aromoense 
Anthurium arusiense 
Anthurium asplundii 
Anthurium atamainii 
Anthurium atramentarium 
Anthurium atroguttatum 
Anthurium atropurpureum 
Anthurium atrovinosum 
Anthurium atroviride 
Anthurium augustinum 
Anthurium aureum 
Anthurium auritum 
Anthurium austin-smithii 
Anthurium aylwardianum

B 

Anthurium baguense 
Anthurium bakeri 
Anthurium balaoanum 
Anthurium baldinii 
Anthurium balslevii 
Anthurium banderasense 
Anthurium bantanum 
Anthurium barbacoasense 
Anthurium barclayanum 
Anthurium barreranum 
Anthurium barrieri 
Anthurium barryi 
Anthurium basirotundum 
Anthurium batistae 
Anthurium bayae 
Anthurium becerrae 
Anthurium beckii 
Anthurium bellum 
Anthurium beltianum 
Anthurium benavidesiae 
Anthurium benktsparrei 
Anthurium bernalii 
Anthurium bernardii 
Anthurium berriozabalense 
Anthurium berryi 
Anthurium besseae 
Anthurium betanianum 
Anthurium betsyae 
Anthurium bicordoense 
Anthurium bimarginatum 
Anthurium binotii 
Anthurium birdseyanum 
Anthurium bittneri 
Anthurium blanquitense 
Anthurium bocainense 
Anthurium boekei 
Anthurium bogneri 
Anthurium bogotense 
Anthurium bonplandii 
Anthurium boosianum 
Anthurium boudetii 
Anthurium boylei 
Anthurium brachypodum 
Anthurium bradeanum 
Anthurium bragae 
Anthurium bredemeyeri 
Anthurium brenesii 
Anthurium brent-berlinii 
Anthurium breviapiculum 
Anthurium brevipedunculatum 
Anthurium brevipes 
Anthurium breviscapum 
Anthurium brevispadix 
Anthurium brigadeiroense 
Anthurium brittonianum 
Anthurium bromelicola 
Anthurium brownii 
Anthurium bruxellense 
Anthurium bucayanum 
Anthurium buchtienii 
Anthurium buganum 
Anthurium bullianum 
Anthurium bullosum 
Anthurium burgeri 
Anthurium bushii 
Anthurium bustamanteae

C  

Anthurium cabrerense 
Anthurium cabuyalense 
Anthurium cachabianum 
Anthurium cachoeirense 
Anthurium cainarachense 
Anthurium caldodsonii 
Anthurium calimense 
Anthurium callejasii 
Anthurium caloveboranum 
Anthurium campii 
Anthurium camposii 
Anthurium canaliculatum 
Anthurium candolleanum 
Anthurium caparaoense 
Anthurium caperatum 
Anthurium caraboboense 
Anthurium caramantae 
Anthurium carchiense 
Anthurium cardenasii 
Anthurium carinatum 
Anthurium caripense 
Anthurium carlablackiae 
Anthurium carmenense 
Anthurium carneospadix 
Anthurium carnosum 
Anthurium carpishense 
Anthurium carrasquillanum 
Anthurium cartiense 
Anthurium cartilagineum 
Anthurium cascajalense 
Anthurium castillomontii 
Anthurium cataniapoense 
Anthurium caucanum 
Anthurium caucavallense 
Anthurium caulorrhizum 
Anthurium ceratiinum 
Anthurium ceronii 
Anthurium cerrateae 
Anthurium cerrobaulense 
Anthurium cerrocampanense 
Anthurium cerrofrioense 
Anthurium cerropelonense 
Anthurium cerropirrense 
Anthurium cerrosantiagoense 
Anthurium chacoense 
Anthurium chamberlainii 
Anthurium chamulense 
Anthurium chequitavense 
Anthurium chiapasense 
Anthurium chimborazense 
Anthurium chinchipense 
Anthurium chinimense 
Anthurium chiriquense 
Anthurium chocoense 
Anthurium chorense 
Anthurium chorranum 
Anthurium christeliae 
Anthurium chromostachyum 
Anthurium chrysolithos 
Anthurium chucantiense 
Anthurium chuchubiense 
Anthurium chucunesense 
Anthurium churchilliorum 
Anthurium churutense 
Anthurium cinereopetiolatum 
Anthurium cipoense 
Anthurium circinatum 
Anthurium cirinoi 
Anthurium citrifolium 
Anthurium clarinervium 
Anthurium clarkei 
Anthurium clathratum 
Anthurium clavatum 
Anthurium clavigerum 
Anthurium cleistanthum 
Anthurium clewellii 
Anthurium clidemioides 
Anthurium cobbiae 
Anthurium coclense 
Anthurium cocornaense 
Anthurium coerulescens 
Anthurium cogolloanum 
Anthurium coicoyanense 
Anthurium coleomischum 
Anthurium coleorrhiza 
Anthurium collettianum 
Anthurium collinsii 
Anthurium colonchense 
Anthurium colonense 
Anthurium colonicum 
Anthurium coloradense 
Anthurium combeimense 
Anthurium comtum 
Anthurium concinnatum 
Anthurium concolor 
Anthurium conjunctum 
Anthurium consimile 
Anthurium consobrinum 
Anthurium conspicuum 
Anthurium constrictum 
Anthurium conterminum 
Anthurium copense 
Anthurium corallinum 
Anthurium cordatotriangulum 
Anthurium cordatum 
Anthurium cordiforme 
Anthurium cordobense 
Anthurium cordulatum 
Anthurium coriaceum 
Anthurium coripatense 
Anthurium cornejoi 
Anthurium correae 
Anthurium corrugatum 
Anthurium cotejense 
Anthurium cotobrusii 
Anthurium cowanii 
Anthurium crassifolium 
Anthurium crassilaminum 
Anthurium crassinervium 
Anthurium crassiradix 
Anthurium crassitepalum 
Anthurium crassivenium 
Anthurium cremersii 
Anthurium crenatum 
Anthurium croatii 
Anthurium cronembergerae 
Anthurium crystallinum 
Anthurium cuasicanum 
Anthurium cubense 
Anthurium cucullispathum 
Anthurium cultrifolium 
Anthurium cupreonitens 
Anthurium cupreum 
Anthurium cupulispathum 
Anthurium curicuriariense 
Anthurium curtipedunculum 
Anthurium curtispadix 
Anthurium curvatum 
Anthurium curvilaminum 
Anthurium curvispadix 
Anthurium cuspidatum 
Anthurium cuspidiferum 
Anthurium cutucuense 
Anthurium cuyabenoense 
Anthurium cylindratum 
Anthurium cymbiforme 
Anthurium cymbispatha

D 

Anthurium dabeibaense 
Anthurium daguense 
Anthurium dalmauii 
Anthurium darcyi 
Anthurium davidsei 
Anthurium davidsoniae 
Anthurium debile 
Anthurium debile-emarginatum 
Anthurium debilipeltatum 
Anthurium decipiens 
Anthurium decurrens 
Anthurium decursivum 
Anthurium deflexum 
Anthurium delannayi 
Anthurium deminutum 
Anthurium dendrobates 
Anthurium denudatum 
Anthurium diazii 
Anthurium dichromum 
Anthurium dichrophyllum 
Anthurium digitatum 
Anthurium diversicaudex 
Anthurium dolichocnemum 
Anthurium dolichophyllum 
Anthurium dolichostachyum 
Anthurium dombeyanum 
Anthurium dominicense 
Anthurium donovaniae 
Anthurium dorbayae 
Anthurium draconopterum 
Anthurium dressleri 
Anthurium dukei 
Anthurium durandii 
Anthurium dussii 
Anthurium dwyeri 
Anthurium dylanii

E 
Anthurium ecuadorense 
Anthurium effusilobum 
Anthurium effusispathum 
Anthurium eggersii 
Anthurium eichleri 
Anthurium elisalevyae 
Anthurium ellenbergii 
Anthurium elquincense 
Anthurium emarginatum 
Anthurium eminens 
Anthurium ensifolium 
Anthurium ericae 
Anthurium ernesti 
Anthurium erskinei 
Anthurium erythrospadix 
Anthurium erythrospathaceum 
Anthurium erythrostachyum 
Anthurium esmeraldense 
Anthurium espinae 
Anthurium espiranzaense 
Anthurium eximium 
Anthurium expansum 
Anthurium exstipulatum

F 

Anthurium fasciale 
Anthurium fatoense 
Anthurium faustomirandae 
Anthurium fendleri 
Anthurium fernandezii 
Anthurium filamatamaense 
Anthurium filiforme 
Anthurium flavescens 
Anthurium flavidum 
Anthurium flavolineatum 
Anthurium flavoviride 
Anthurium flexile 
Anthurium fogdeniorum 
Anthurium folsomianum 
Anthurium fontellanum 
Anthurium fontoides 
Anthurium foreroanum 
Anthurium forgetii 
Anthurium formosum 
Anthurium fornicifolium 
Anthurium fortunense 
Anthurium fosteri 
Anthurium fragae 
Anthurium fragrans 
Anthurium fragrantissimum 
Anthurium fraseri 
Anthurium friedrichsthalii 
Anthurium frontinoense 
Anthurium funiferum 
Anthurium furcatum 
Anthurium fuscopunctatum 
Anthurium fusiforme

G 

Anthurium gaffurii 
Anthurium galactospadix 
Anthurium galeanoae 
Anthurium galeottii 
Anthurium galileanum 
Anthurium gaskinii 
Anthurium gaudichaudianum 
Anthurium gehrigeri 
Anthurium geitnerianum 
Anthurium gelpii 
Anthurium genferryae 
Anthurium geniculatum 
Anthurium gentryi 
Anthurium gerherrerae 
Anthurium giganteum 
Anthurium ginesii 
Anthurium giraldoi 
Anthurium gladiifolium 
Anthurium glanduligerum 
Anthurium glaucophyllum 
Anthurium glaucospadix 
Anthurium globosum 
Anthurium gomesianum 
Anthurium gonzalezii 
Anthurium gracile 
Anthurium gracililaminum 
Anthurium gracilipedunculatum 
Anthurium gracilispadix 
Anthurium gracilistipum 
Anthurium grande 
Anthurium grandicataphyllum 
Anthurium grandifolium 
Anthurium granulineare 
Anthurium grex-avium 
Anthurium griseosessile 
Anthurium gualeanum 
Anthurium guanacense 
Anthurium guanchezii 
Anthurium guanghuae 
Anthurium guatemalense 
Anthurium guayaquilense 
Anthurium gustavii 
Anthurium gymnopus

H 

Anthurium hacumense 
Anthurium hagsaterianum 
Anthurium halmoorei 
Anthurium haltonii 
Anthurium hamiltonii 
Anthurium hammelii 
Anthurium hannoniae 
Anthurium harleyi 
Anthurium harlingianum 
Anthurium harrisii 
Anthurium hartmanii 
Anthurium hastifolium 
Anthurium hatschbachii 
Anthurium hayanum 
Anthurium hebetatilaminum 
Anthurium hebetatum 
Anthurium hempeanum 
Anthurium henryi 
Anthurium herrerae 
Anthurium herthae 
Anthurium hieronymi 
Anthurium hinoideum 
Anthurium hodgei 
Anthurium hoehnei 
Anthurium hoffmannii 
Anthurium holm-nielsenii 
Anthurium holquinianum 
Anthurium hookeri 
Anthurium hornitense 
Anthurium horridum 
Anthurium huacamayoense 
Anthurium huallagense 
Anthurium huampamiense 
Anthurium huanucense 
Anthurium huashikatii 
Anthurium huautlense 
Anthurium huberi 
Anthurium huixtlense 
Anthurium humboldtianum 
Anthurium humoense 
Anthurium hutchisonii 
Anthurium hygrophilum

I 
Anthurium ianthinopodum 
Anthurium icanense 
Anthurium idimae 
Anthurium idmense 
Anthurium illepidum 
Anthurium iltisii 
Anthurium imazaense 
Anthurium imperiale 
Anthurium impolitoellipticum 
Anthurium impolitum 
Anthurium incomptum 
Anthurium inconspicuum 
Anthurium incurvatum 
Anthurium incurvum 
Anthurium infectorium 
Anthurium ingramii 
Anthurium intactum 
Anthurium intermedium 
Anthurium interruptum 
Anthurium inzanum 
Anthurium ionanthum 
Anthurium iramireziae 
Anthurium isidroense 
Anthurium ixtlanense

J 
Anthurium jaimeanum 
Anthurium jaramilloi 
Anthurium jefense 
Anthurium jenmanii 
Anthurium jesusii 
Anthurium jilekii 
Anthurium jimenae 
Anthurium joaquinense 
Anthurium johnmackii 
Anthurium johnsoniae 
Anthurium jorgemendietanum 
Anthurium josei 
Anthurium juanguillermoi 
Anthurium julianii 
Anthurium julospadix 
Anthurium jureianum

K 
Anthurium kajekaii 
Anthurium kallunkiae 
Anthurium kamemotoanum 
Anthurium kareniae 
Anthurium karstenianum 
Anthurium kastelskii 
Anthurium kayapii 
Anthurium keatingii 
Anthurium kinsingeriae 
Anthurium kirkdukeorum 
Anthurium knappiae 
Anthurium krukovii 
Anthurium kugkumasii 
Anthurium kunayalense 
Anthurium kunthii 
Anthurium kusuense

L 

Anthurium lacerdae 
Anthurium laciniosum 
Anthurium lactifructum 
Anthurium laevigatum 
Anthurium laevum 
Anthurium lakei 
Anthurium laminense 
Anthurium lancea 
Anthurium lancetillense 
Anthurium lancifolium 
Anthurium langendoenii 
Anthurium langsdorffii 
Anthurium lanjouwii 
Anthurium lasabanetaense 
Anthurium latemarginatum 
Anthurium latissimum 
Anthurium lautum 
Anthurium lechlerianum 
Anthurium lehmannii 
Anthurium lennartii 
Anthurium lentii 
Anthurium leonianum 
Anthurium leonii 
Anthurium leptocaule 
Anthurium leptos 
Anthurium leuconeurum 
Anthurium leveaui 
Anthurium lezamae 
Anthurium libanoense 
Anthurium licium 
Anthurium lievenii 
Anthurium ligulare 
Anthurium lilacinum 
Anthurium lilafructum 
Anthurium limonense 
Anthurium lindenianum 
Anthurium lindmanianum 
Anthurium lineolatum 
Anthurium linganii 
Anthurium lingua 
Anthurium linguifolium 
Anthurium llanense 
Anthurium llewellynii 
Anthurium lloense 
Anthurium loefgrenii 
Anthurium lojtnantii 
Anthurium longegeniculatum 
Anthurium longeinternodum 
Anthurium longicaudatum 
Anthurium longicuspidatum 
Anthurium longifolium 
Anthurium longipeltatum 
Anthurium longipes 
Anthurium longispadiceum 
Anthurium longissimilobum 
Anthurium longissimum 
Anthurium longistamineum 
Anthurium longistipitatum 
Anthurium longiusculum 
Anthurium loretense 
Anthurium louisii 
Anthurium lucens 
Anthurium lucidum 
Anthurium lucilanum 
Anthurium lucioi 
Anthurium lucorum 
Anthurium luschnathianum 
Anthurium luteospathum 
Anthurium lutescens 
Anthurium luteynii 
Anthurium lutheri 
Anthurium luxurians 
Anthurium luzense 
Anthurium lygrum 
Anthurium lynniae

M 

Anthurium maasii 
Anthurium macarenense 
Anthurium macbridei 
Anthurium macdanielii 
Anthurium machetioides 
Anthurium macleanii 
Anthurium macphersonii 
Anthurium macrocephalum 
Anthurium macrolonchium 
Anthurium macrophyllum 
Anthurium macropodum 
Anthurium macrospadix 
Anthurium macrourum 
Anthurium maculosum 
Anthurium macveaniae 
Anthurium madisonianum 
Anthurium magdae 
Anthurium magnificum 
Anthurium magnifolium 
Anthurium magrewii 
Anthurium maguirei 
Anthurium malagaense 
Anthurium malianum 
Anthurium manabianum 
Anthurium mancuniense 
Anthurium mansellii 
Anthurium manuanum 
Anthurium marcusianum 
Anthurium marense 
Anthurium margaricarpum 
Anthurium marginellum 
Anthurium marginervium 
Anthurium mariae 
Anthurium maricense 
Anthurium marinoanum 
Anthurium marleenianum 
Anthurium marmoratum 
Anthurium martae 
Anthurium martianum 
Anthurium martinellii 
Anthurium masfense 
Anthurium mateoi 
Anthurium mausethii 
Anthurium maximum 
Anthurium megapetiolatum 
Anthurium melampyi 
Anthurium melanochlorum 
Anthurium melastomatis 
Anthurium membranaceum 
Anthurium mendietae 
Anthurium merlei 
Anthurium metallicum 
Anthurium miaziense 
Anthurium michelii 
Anthurium microphyllum 
Anthurium microspadix 
Anthurium mikeneei 
Anthurium minarum 
Anthurium mindense 
Anthurium miniatum 
Anthurium minutipustulum 
Anthurium miritiparanaense 
Anthurium misturatum 
Anthurium modicum 
Anthurium molaui 
Anthurium molle 
Anthurium mongonense 
Anthurium montanum 
Anthurium monteagudoi 
Anthurium monteazulense 
Anthurium monteverdense 
Anthurium monticola 
Anthurium monzonense 
Anthurium moonenii 
Anthurium morae 
Anthurium morii 
Anthurium moronense 
Anthurium mostaceroi 
Anthurium mourae 
Anthurium mucuri 
Anthurium multinervium 
Anthurium multisulcatum 
Anthurium munchiquense 
Anthurium myosuroides 
Anthurium myosurus

N  

Anthurium nakamurae 
Anthurium nangaritense 
Anthurium nanum 
Anthurium napaeum 
Anthurium narae 
Anthurium narinoense 
Anthurium narvaezii 
Anthurium navasii 
Anthurium naviculare 
Anthurium nelsonii 
Anthurium nemorale 
Anthurium nemoricola 
Anthurium nervatum 
Anthurium nestorpazii 
Anthurium ngabebuglense 
Anthurium nicolasianum 
Anthurium nigrescens 
Anthurium nigropunctatum 
Anthurium niqueanum 
Anthurium nitens 
Anthurium nitidulum 
Anthurium nitidum 
Anthurium nizandense 
Anthurium nomdiosense 
Anthurium novencidoanum 
Anthurium novitaense 
Anthurium nubicola 
Anthurium nutibarense 
Anthurium nymphaeifolium

O 
Anthurium obliquatum 
Anthurium obpyriforme 
Anthurium obscurinervium 
Anthurium obtusatum 
Anthurium obtusifolium 
Anthurium obtusilobum 
Anthurium obtusum 
Anthurium occidentale 
Anthurium ochranthum 
Anthurium ochreatum 
Anthurium ocotepecense 
Anthurium oerstedianum 
Anthurium oistophyllum 
Anthurium oreodoxa 
Anthurium oreophilum 
Anthurium organense 
Anthurium orientale 
Anthurium orlandoi 
Anthurium orlando-ortizii 
Anthurium ottobuchtienii 
Anthurium ottonis 
Anthurium ovatifolium 
Anthurium ovidioi 
Anthurium oxyanthum 
Anthurium oxybelium 
Anthurium oxycarpum 
Anthurium oxyphyllum 
Anthurium oxystachyum 
Anthurium oyuelae

P 

Anthurium pachylaminum 
Anthurium pachyspathum 
Anthurium pageanum 
Anthurium pahumense 
Anthurium palacioanum 
Anthurium palenquense 
Anthurium pallatangense 
Anthurium pallens 
Anthurium pallidicaudex 
Anthurium pallidiflorum 
Anthurium palmarense 
Anthurium palmatum 
Anthurium paloraense 
Anthurium palosecense 
Anthurium paludosum 
Anthurium panamense 
Anthurium panduriforme 
Anthurium pandurilaminum 
Anthurium papillilaminum 
Anthurium paradisicum 
Anthurium paraguasense 
Anthurium paraguayense 
Anthurium parambae 
Anthurium parasiticum 
Anthurium pariense 
Anthurium parvispathum 
Anthurium parvum 
Anthurium pastasanum 
Anthurium patens 
Anthurium pauciflorum 
Anthurium paucinerve 
Anthurium payaminoense 
Anthurium pazii 
Anthurium pedatoradiatum 
Anthurium pedatum 
Anthurium pedrazae 
Anthurium pedunculare 
Anthurium pellucidopunctatum 
Anthurium peltatum 
Anthurium peltigerum 
Anthurium penae 
Anthurium pendens 
Anthurium pendulifolium 
Anthurium pendulispadix 
Anthurium penningtonii 
Anthurium penonomense 
Anthurium pentaphyllum 
Anthurium perijanum 
Anthurium perviride 
Anthurium pescadilloense 
Anthurium petiolicarinatum 
Anthurium petrophilum 
Anthurium phyllobaris 
Anthurium picadoae 
Anthurium pichinchae 
Anthurium pichindense 
Anthurium pilonense 
Anthurium pinkleyi 
Anthurium pirottae 
Anthurium pirrense 
Anthurium pittieri 
Anthurium piurensis 
Anthurium planadense 
Anthurium plantagineum 
Anthurium platyglossum 
Anthurium platyrhizum 
Anthurium plowmanii 
Anthurium plurisulcatum 
Anthurium pluviaticum 
Anthurium podophyllum 
Anthurium pohlianum 
Anthurium poloense 
Anthurium polydactylum 
Anthurium polynervium 
Anthurium polyneuron 
Anthurium polyphlebium 
Anthurium polyschistum 
Anthurium polystictum 
Anthurium porcesitoense 
Anthurium potarense 
Anthurium pradoense 
Anthurium praealtum 
Anthurium pranceanum 
Anthurium prolatum 
Anthurium prominens 
Anthurium promininerve 
Anthurium protensum 
Anthurium protrudens 
Anthurium pseudonigrescens 
Anthurium pseudospectabile 
Anthurium pseudotalamancae 
Anthurium psilostachyum 
Anthurium ptarianum 
Anthurium ptenospathum 
Anthurium puberulinervium 
Anthurium puberulum 
Anthurium pucayacuense 
Anthurium pucuroense 
Anthurium pulcachense 
Anthurium pulchellum 
Anthurium pulidoae 
Anthurium pulverulentum 
Anthurium punctatum 
Anthurium punkuyocense 
Anthurium purdieanum 
Anthurium purpureospathum 
Anthurium purpureum

Q 
Anthurium queirozianum 
Anthurium quinindense 
Anthurium quinonesiae 
Anthurium quinquenervium 
Anthurium quinquesulcatum 
Anthurium quipuscoae

R 

Anthurium radiatum 
Anthurium radicans 
Anthurium raimundii 
Anthurium ramoncaracasii 
Anthurium ramonense 
Anthurium ramosense 
Anthurium ramosii 
Anthurium ranchoanum 
Anthurium raphaelense 
Anthurium ratonense 
Anthurium ravenii 
Anthurium recavum 
Anthurium rectinervium 
Anthurium redolens 
Anthurium reflexinervium 
Anthurium regale 
Anthurium remotigeniculatum 
Anthurium remotum 
Anthurium renteriae 
Anthurium resectum 
Anthurium restrepoae 
Anthurium reticulatum 
Anthurium retiferum 
Anthurium rhizophorum 
Anthurium rhodorhizum 
Anthurium ribeiroi 
Anthurium ricaurtense 
Anthurium rigidifolium 
Anthurium rimbachii 
Anthurium rioacimense 
Anthurium riocojimiesense 
Anthurium riodocense 
Anthurium riofrioi 
Anthurium riograndicola 
Anthurium riojaense 
Anthurium rionegrense 
Anthurium riparium 
Anthurium rivulare 
Anthurium rociorojasiae 
Anthurium rodrigueziae 
Anthurium rodvasquezii 
Anthurium roezlii 
Anthurium rojasiae 
Anthurium roraimense 
Anthurium roseonaviculare 
Anthurium roseospadix 
Anthurium rosselianum 
Anthurium rotundatum 
Anthurium rotundilobum 
Anthurium rotundistigmatum 
Anthurium roubikii 
Anthurium rubrifructum 
Anthurium rubrivellus 
Anthurium rugulosum 
Anthurium rupestre 
Anthurium rupicola 
Anthurium rzedowskii

S 

Anthurium saccardoi 
Anthurium sagawae 
Anthurium sagittale 
Anthurium sagittaria 
Anthurium sagittatum 
Anthurium sagittellum 
Anthurium sagrilloanum 
Anthurium sakuraguianum 
Anthurium salgarense 
Anthurium salvadorense 
Anthurium salvinii 
Anthurium samamaense 
Anthurium sanctifidense 
Anthurium sanguineum 
Anthurium sanjorgense 
Anthurium santamariae 
Anthurium santaritensis 
Anthurium santiagoense 
Anthurium sapense 
Anthurium sarmentosum 
Anthurium sarukhanianum 
Anthurium scaberulum 
Anthurium scandens 
Anthurium scherzerianum 
Anthurium schlechtendalii 
Anthurium schottianum 
Anthurium schunkei 
Anthurium sebastianense 
Anthurium seibertii 
Anthurium seleri 
Anthurium × selloanum 
Anthurium sellowianum 
Anthurium septuplinervium 
Anthurium shinumas 
Anthurium siapidaarae 
Anthurium siccisilvarum 
Anthurium sidneyi 
Anthurium sierpense 
Anthurium signatum 
Anthurium silanchense 
Anthurium silverstonei 
Anthurium silvicola 
Anthurium silvigaudens 
Anthurium simonii 
Anthurium simpsonii 
Anthurium sinuatum 
Anthurium siqueirae 
Anthurium sixaolense 
Anthurium smaragdinum 
Anthurium smithii 
Anthurium sneidernii 
Anthurium sodiroanum 
Anthurium soejartoi 
Anthurium solanoi 
Anthurium solitarium 
Anthurium solomonii 
Anthurium sonaense 
Anthurium soukupii 
Anthurium sparreorum 
Anthurium spathiphyllum 
Anthurium spathulifolium 
Anthurium spectabile 
Anthurium splendidum 
Anthurium standleyi 
Anthurium stephanii 
Anthurium stipitatum 
Anthurium straminopetiolum 
Anthurium striatipes 
Anthurium striatum 
Anthurium striolatum 
Anthurium stuebelii 
Anthurium subaequans 
Anthurium subcarinatum 
Anthurium subcaudatum 
Anthurium subcoerulescens 
Anthurium subcordatum 
Anthurium subhastatum 
Anthurium subovatum 
Anthurium subrotundum 
Anthurium subsagittatum 
Anthurium subscriptum 
Anthurium subsignatum 
Anthurium subtriangulare 
Anthurium subtrilobum 
Anthurium subtruncatum 
Anthurium subulatum 
Anthurium sucrii 
Anthurium suethompsoniae 
Anthurium suffusum 
Anthurium sulcatum 
Anthurium superbum 
Anthurium supianum 
Anthurium supraglandulum 
Anthurium suramaense 
Anthurium sylvestre 
Anthurium sytsmae

T 

Anthurium tacarcunense 
Anthurium tachiranum 
Anthurium talamancae 
Anthurium talmonii 
Anthurium tamaense 
Anthurium tarapotense 
Anthurium tatei 
Anthurium taylorianum 
Anthurium teimosoanum 
Anthurium temponiae 
Anthurium tenaense 
Anthurium tenerum 
Anthurium tenuicaule 
Anthurium tenuifolium 
Anthurium tenuireticulum 
Anthurium tenuispica 
Anthurium teribense 
Anthurium ternifolium 
Anthurium terracola 
Anthurium terryae 
Anthurium testaceum 
Anthurium thompsoniae 
Anthurium thrinax 
Anthurium tifense 
Anthurium tikunorum 
Anthurium tilaranense 
Anthurium timplowmanii 
Anthurium titanium 
Anthurium toisanense 
Anthurium tolimense 
Anthurium tomasiae 
Anthurium tonduzii 
Anthurium tonianum 
Anthurium torraense 
Anthurium tortuosum 
Anthurium totontepecense 
Anthurium trangulohastatum 
Anthurium treleasei 
Anthurium tremulum 
Anthurium trianae 
Anthurium triangulopetiolum 
Anthurium tricarinatum 
Anthurium triciafrankiae 
Anthurium trifidum 
Anthurium trilobum 
Anthurium trinervium 
Anthurium triphyllum 
Anthurium trisectum 
Anthurium trujilloi 
Anthurium truncatulum 
Anthurium truncatum 
Anthurium truncicola 
Anthurium tsamajainii 
Anthurium tubualaense 
Anthurium tunquii 
Anthurium tutense 
Anthurium tysonii

U 
Anthurium uasadiensis 
Anthurium uleanum 
Anthurium umbraculum 
Anthurium umbricola 
Anthurium umbrosum 
Anthurium unense 
Anthurium upalaense 
Anthurium urvilleanum 
Anthurium utleyorum

V  
Anthurium valenzuelae 
Anthurium validifolium 
Anthurium validinervium 
Anthurium vallense 
Anthurium vanderknaapii 
Anthurium variegatum 
Anthurium variilobum 
Anthurium vaupesianum 
Anthurium veitchii 
Anthurium velutinum 
Anthurium venadoense 
Anthurium venosum 
Anthurium ventanasense 
Anthurium verapazense 
Anthurium verrucosum 
Anthurium versicolor 
Anthurium vestitum 
Anthurium victorii 
Anthurium vientense 
Anthurium vinillense 
Anthurium viridescens 
Anthurium viridifusiforme 
Anthurium viridispathum 
Anthurium viridivinosum 
Anthurium vittariifolium 
Anthurium vomeriforme

W 
Anthurium wagenerianum 
Anthurium wallisii 
Anthurium walujewii 
Anthurium waramirezii 
Anthurium warintsense 
Anthurium warocqueanum 
Anthurium watermaliense 
Anthurium wattii 
Anthurium weberbaueri 
Anthurium wedelianum 
Anthurium wendlingeri 
Anthurium werffii 
Anthurium werneri 
Anthurium whitmorei 
Anthurium willdenowii 
Anthurium willifordii 
Anthurium wintersii 
Anthurium wurdackii

X 
Anthurium xanthoneurum 
Anthurium xanthophylloides

Y 
Anthurium yamayakatense 
Anthurium yanacochense 
Anthurium yarumalense 
Anthurium yatacuense 
Anthurium yetlense 
Anthurium yungasense 
Anthurium yurimaguense 
Anthurium yutajense

Z 
Anthurium zappiae 
Anthurium zeneidae 
Anthurium zuluagae

References 

Anthurium